Gail Martin may refer to:

Gail Z. Martin (born 1962), American writer and author
Gail R. Martin, American biologist attributed with coining the term "embryonic stem cell"
 Gail Gaymer Martin, American Christian speaker and novelist
Gail Martin (1923–2013), Archery Hall of Fame Bow maker.

See also
Luis Miguel Gail Martín (born 1961), former Spanish footballer